Lessebo is a locality and the seat of Lessebo Municipality, Kronoberg County, Sweden with 2,737 inhabitants in 2010.
The Lessebo community formed gradually around the paper and iron works that was founded in 1660. Today Vida Paper AB runs the pulp and paper mill as well as The Lessebo Hand Paper Mill which is one of very few commercially run European hand paper mills still existing.

Lessebo is situated in what is called the Kingdom of Crystal, which is the centre of Swedish mouth blown glass production.

References 

Populated places in Kronoberg County
Populated places in Lessebo Municipality
Municipal seats of Kronoberg County
Swedish municipal seats
Värend